Remixes in the Key of B is the second remix album by American singer Bobby Brown, released in 1993. It features remixes of songs from the album Bobby.

Track listing
"Two Can Play That Game" – 7:10
"Shock G's Get Away" – 6:28
"T.R.'s Get Away" – 6:23
"Humpin' Around" – 8:08
"She's My Lady" – 5:45
"That's the Way Love Is" – 7:20
"Something in Common" (featuring Whitney Houston) – 7:00
"One More Night" – 6:21
"I Want You, I Need You" – 4:55
"Good Enough" – 4:48
"Storm Away" – 6:27

References

Bobby Brown albums
1993 remix albums
MCA Records remix albums